was a women's football team which played in Division 1 of Japan's Nadeshiko League. It founded the league back in 1976. The club was disbanded in 2008.

Honors

Domestic competitions
Nadeshiko.League Division 1
Champions (1) : 2003
Runners-up (4) : 2001, 2002, 2005, 2007
Empress's Cup All-Japan Women's Football Tournament
Champions (4) : 1999, 2002, 2003, 2006
Runners-up (4) : 2000, 2001, 2005, 2007
Nadeshiko Super Cup
Champions (1) : 2006
Runners-up (1) : 2007

Results

Transition of team name
Kobe FC Ladies : 1976 - 1988
Tasaki-Shinju Kobe Ladies : 1989 - 1990
Tasaki Kobe Ladies : 1991 - 1992
Tasaki Perule FC : 1993 – 2008

External links 

Japanese women's club teams

Women's football clubs in Japan
Association football clubs established in 1976
Association football clubs disestablished in 2008
1976 establishments in Japan
2008 disestablishments in Japan
Sports teams in Kobe